Jap is a slur directed towards Japanese people.

Jap or JAP may refer to:

 Johan Adolf Pengel International Airport, Paramaribo, Suriname, local name
Journal of Applied Physics
 Java Anon Proxy for anonymous Web browsing
 Juntas de Abastecimientos y Precios, rationing boards in Chile under president Allende
 Juventudes de Acción Popular, the youth movement of the CEDA in Spain
 Jewish-American princess (may also refer to "prince" or other variations)
 JA Prestwich Industries, former UK engine manufacturer
 Jap, West Virginia, a community in West Virginia, USA
 "JAP", a single by J-Pop band Abingdon Boys School
 Boondocks Road, formerly known as Jap Road in Texas
 Yosami Transmitting Station, a defunct VLF transmitting station using the callsign JAP

See also
 Japp (disambiguation)
 Jaap (disambiguation)